Goldimouse and the Three Cats is a 1960 Warner Bros. Looney Tunes animated cartoon directed by Friz Freleng. The short was released on March 15, 1960, and stars Sylvester and Sylvester Jr.

This cartoon was included in the 1982 feature film Bugs Bunny's 3rd Movie: 1001 Rabbit Tales.

Plot
In a cottage live the Three Cats: Sylvester (father cat), Mrs. Sylvester (mother cat), and Sylvester Jr. (baby cat alias "Spoiled Brat" as Sylvester calls him). Sylvester finds his porridge is too hot and Mrs. Sylvester finds her porridge too cold, but Sylvester Jr. complains on why they are having to eat porridge instead of mice like other cats. Sylvester suggests that they go for a walk in the woods to wait for the porridge to cool down (commenting "Now where have I heard that before?").

While they are away, Goldimouse (a mouse with curly blonde locks) enters the house through a tiny door, spies the porridge, and eats it. Afterwards, Goldimouse feels sleepy and tries all three beds and finds Sylvester Jr.'s just right, so Goldimouse takes it and goes to sleep.

Later on, Sylvester and his family return from their walk and discover Goldimouse's handiwork.  While going through the whole "Somebody's been eating my porridge" and "Somebody's been sleeping in my bed" bit, Sylvester Jr. is relieved that his porridge is all gone and that the intruder in his bed is a mouse. When he says this, Goldimouse wakes up, scared at the sight of Sylvester Jr. and turns to Sylvester for help, but then notices that he, too, is also a cat and escapes out the tiny door.

At his son's insistence, Sylvester tries to get Goldimouse out of the mousehole, but she thwarts his multiple attempts. After Sylvester's latest failure to rid Goldimouse with explosives when he built a shelter for his family, he returns in scorched from the explosion and brings Junior his breakfast after Junior hyperactively asks him about catching the Goldimouse, but consisting of a bowl of porridge instead. Sylvester dumps it on Junior's head and then leaves the shelter angrily, indicating that he finally has had enough of Junior's spoiled attitude. The cartoon ends with Junior complaining on the porridge once again.

Voice cast
Mel Blanc as Sylvester / Sylvester Jr.
June Foray as Narrator / Mrs. Sylvester / Goldimouse (uncredited)

References

External links

 
 

1960 films
1960 short films
1960 comedy films
1960 animated films
1960s children's comedy films
1960s children's fantasy films
1960s children's animated films
1960s fantasy comedy films
1960s English-language films
1960s Warner Bros. animated short films
American children's animated comedy films
American children's animated fantasy films
American animated short films
American fantasy comedy films
American parody films
Fairy tale parody films
Surreal comedy films
Looney Tunes shorts
Films based on Goldilocks and the Three Bears
Sylvester the Cat films
Animated films about families
Films about mice and rats
Talking animals in fiction
Films set in forests
Short films directed by Friz Freleng
Films with screenplays by Michael Maltese
Films scored by Milt Franklyn
Warner Bros. Cartoons animated short films